The 1991–92 NBA season was the Mavericks' 12th season in the National Basketball Association. The Mavericks had the sixth pick in the 1991 NBA draft, and selected Doug Smith from the University of Missouri. Prior to the start of the season, Roy Tarpley was banned from the NBA for violating the league's substance abuse policy for a third time. Fat Lever missed most of the season again due to injury, only playing in just 31 games, as the Mavericks began to regret acquiring him from the Denver Nuggets for two first round draft picks. After a 12–15 start, the Mavericks struggled and went on an 11-game losing streak as they lost 19 of 20 games. At midseason, the team traded James Donaldson to the New York Knicks in exchange for Brian Quinnett. The Mavericks got even worse posting a 15-game losing streak in March, and finishing fifth in the Midwest Division with a 22–60 record.

Following the season, Rolando Blackman was traded to the New York Knicks, while Herb Williams signed as a free agent with the Knicks, Rodney McCray was dealt to the Chicago Bulls, Quinnett was released to free agency, and Brad Davis, the last of the original Mavericks, would retire.

This was also the final season where the Mavericks sported green primary road uniforms.

Draft picks

Roster

Regular season

Season standings

y - clinched division title
x - clinched playoff spot

z - clinched division title
y - clinched division title
x - clinched playoff spot

Record vs. opponents

Game log

Player statistics

Awards and records

Transactions

References

See also
 1991-92 NBA season

Dallas Mavericks seasons
Dallas
Dallas
Dallas